HMS Argonaut (F56) was a  that served with the Royal Navy from 1967 to 1993. She took part in the Falklands War in 1982, sustaining damage and casualties in action.

Construction
The ship was built at Hebburn, in Tyneside, by the Hawthorn Leslie and Company shipyard in the mid-1960s. She was launched on 8 February 1966, and commissioned into the Royal Navy on 17 August 1967.

Service history

1967–1982
In her first year Argonaut escorted the ocean liner  on her last voyage across the North Atlantic Ocean to a permanent berth to serve as a hotel/tourist attraction in California, United States.

In 1968 "Argonaut" joined NATO (STANAVFORLANT)

In 1969 Argonaut, with other Royal Navy vessels, sailed with the "Beira Patrol", a United Nations operation preventing the importation of oil by Rhodesia as a part of the British Government's economic sanctions against that country.

In 1969 in an eleven-month deployment "Argonaut" circumnavigated the globe, visiting multiple countries, and also conducted a famine relief operation to FIJI(SUVA)

In 1973, Argonaut was recommissioned, completed a six-week work up at Portland, visited Brest, France and then served as a guard ship for the Gibraltar station. Following Iceland's declaration of a 200-mile fishing limit, Argonaut carried out fishery protection duties for British fishing trawlers inside the zone, in what became known as the "Second Cod War".

In 1974 from mid January, Argonaut spent nine months as part of the group deployment named 'Task Group 317.1', led by Flag Officer Second Flotilla (Commander Task Group 317.1). The other ships in the task group were the  HMS Fife, the frigates of the 7th Frigate Squadron (of which Argonaut was one): HMS Ariadne, HMS Danae, HMS Londonderry, and HMS Scylla (Captain 7th Frigate Squadron), and two Royal Fleet Auxiliaries (one tanker and one solid stores). In November 1974 Argonaut carried out fishery protection duties in the Barents Sea. During this period she visited Hammerfest and Honningsvag in Norway to take on fuel. Before returning to Devonport she visited Newcastle upon Tyne.

In early 1975 Argonaut took part in the annual NATO 'Gate' naval exercise (called 'Locked Gate' or 'Open Gate' in alternating years), and visited Lisbon before returning to Devonport. Argonaut joined the Standing Naval Force Atlantic (Stanavforlant) by late 1975. Argonaut underwent Exocet modernisation between 1976 and 1980, giving her a potent anti-ship capability. In 1981, Argonaut  deployed as the Armilla Patrol ship in the Persian Gulf.

Falklands War

On 2 April 1982 the Falkland Islands were invaded by the armed forces of Argentina. At the direction of Her Majesty's Government, an advanced group of Royal Naval vessels began to steam towards Ascension Island.

On 21 May 1982  Argonaut, along with other destroyers and frigates, provided close escort for amphibious vessels during the opposed arrival at San Carlos by British Forces, with Argonaut standing off the "Fanning Head" headland within Falkland Sound guarding the Northern approaches to the operational area. Whilst this operation was underway, she was attacked by Argentine warplanes throughout the day which Argonaut, engaged with anti-aircraft weapons. Two of the air attacks succeeded in damaging Argonaut.

The first at 10:15 was an improvised assault from a lone Argentine aircraft, piloted by Lt. Guillermo Owen Crippa flying an Aermacchi MB-339 from the Argentine Navy's 1st Naval Air Attack Squadron, who had been despatched on a reconnaissance flight over Falkland Sound to ascertain the veracity of reports it had received from an Argentine Army post present at San Carlos. Spotting the landing underway, Crippa attacked Argonaut with cannon fire and rockets, causing damage to her Type 965 radar.

The second air attack was made at 13.37 by five A-4 Skyhawks from the Argentinian Air Force's 5th Air Brigade, piloted by Lieutenants Fillipini, Autiero, Osses, Robledo, and Ensign Vottero, which hit her with two bombs. Neither exploded, although one killed two sailors, Able Seaman Iain M. Boldy and Able Seaman Matthew J. Stuart, when it entered the ship's Sea Cat missile magazine, detonating two missiles and the other did severe damage to her boiler room, knocking out the ship's power and leaving her dead in the water.  came to the assistance of Argonaut and towed her away from danger as further waves of air attacks came into Falkland Sound. Both bombs were still live and it took some days to defuse them.

On 14 June, Argentine forces on the Falkland Islands surrendered to the British task force. On 26 June 1982 Argonaut sailed back under her own steam to Devonport Dockyard, where she had her battle damage repaired and new sonar equipment fitted.

1982–1993
In 1987 Argonaut rescued the businessman/adventurer Richard Branson from the Atlantic Ocean after he had ditched at sea whilst trying to cross it in a hot-air balloon.

In 1990 Argonaut represented the Royal Navy at commemorations at the Gallipoli peninsula on the 75th Anniversary of the Gallipoli landings.

In August 1992 Argonaut was involved in the pursuit and arrest on the high seas in the South Atlantic Ocean of Roderick Newall, a former British Army officer who had murdered his parents in Jersey.

Fate
Argonaut was decommissioned from the Royal Navy on 31 March 1993, and was laid up at Fareham Creek. On 25 January 1995 she left Portsmouth Harbour under tow to a port in Spain where she was broken up.

Commanding officers

References

Publications
 
 Marriott, Leo, 1983.  Royal Navy Frigates 1945–1983, Ian Allan Ltd.  

 

Leander-class frigates
Falklands War naval ships of the United Kingdom
Maritime incidents in 1982
1966 ships